Recep is a village in the Çelikhan District, Adıyaman Province, Turkey. The village is populated by Kurds of the Reşwan tribe and had a population of 306 in 2021.

The hamlets of Aydoğdu, Çem, Değirmen, Deveboynu, Eskiköy, Kayalık and Şahverdi are attached to Recep.

References 

Villages in Çelikhan District
Kurdish settlements in Adıyaman Province